The following article comprises a list of the characters appearing in the short story serialization Saint Seiya The Lost Canvas - Anecdotes, complementary to the manga Saint Seiya: The Lost Canvas.

These characters appear only in the Anecdotes sidestories and not in the main serialization, ranging from common folk to criminal organizations and the like, although some are featured briefly in the main serialization. Most of these characters appear only in a specific chapter.

As some of the characters appear only in this derivative work and not in Masami Kurumada's original manga, their canonicity within the universe of Kurumada's work is still unrevealed.

Chapter Pisces

Pefko is a young boy whose life was saved by Pisces Albafica, by killing the cadre of Skeleton soldiers who hunted him down. Pefko was also an apprentice of the master healer Luco.

 
Pisces Lugonis was the previous Pisces Gold Saint and the master of Pisces Albafica. He adopted an orphan Albafica when the latter was a baby, cared for him and trained him in the ways of the Saints. Wanting Albafica to become the next Pisces Gold Saint after his death, he performed a ritual along with his disciple, consisting on exchanging blood to see who has the most poisonous one. Albafica's deadly poison blood proves too much for Rugonis, and he dies entrusting his pupil the Pisces Gold Cloth and his position as a Saint.

Non-existent in Kurumada's original manga, Heavenly Standing Star, Dryad Luco is a Specter that was first introduced in the limited The Lost Canvas CD Drama, with his background further explored in the Anecdotes: Chapter Pisces short story. The Specter physically resembles Pisces Rugonis, Albafica's master, as the latter was Luco's older brother. Luco sought to relieve his brother from the curse of his poisonous blood, but was unable to as Rugonis died in the Red Bond ritual, thus Luco now seeks to heal Albafica. Later on, the boy Pefko reveals to Albafica the true reason behind his trek to Sanctuary: Luco is no longer the kind master he knew and is secretly concocting herb brews from the Underworld that transform people into servants of Hades. Realizing Pefko's betrayal, Luco reveals himself as the Dryad Specter to Albafica. Once a gifted Healer himself, when confronted by Albafica, it is revealed that he is immune to his poison due to his white lily field.
In the CD Drama, his attack is named . In the Anecdotes series, Luco is shown to have control over nature ("trees, herbs and flowers", in the Specter's words), claiming that everything is part of him as a Dryad, and he is able to take over Albafica's roses, drastically enlarge their thorns and manipulate them against the Gold Saint with his technique . He was later killed by Albafica's Crimson Thorn technique.

Chapter Scorpio

One of the four sons of Ometecuhtli and Omecihuatl, he is associated with a wide range of concepts, including the night sky, the night winds, hurricanes, the north, the earth, obsidian, enmity, discord, rulership, divination, temptation, jaguars, sorcery, beauty, war and strife. His name in the Nahuatl language is often translated as "Smoking Mirror"

Carbela is a young woman, the owner of the inn Scorpio Kardia visits regularly. She was sought for by the Jaguars, to present her as consort to their Sun Priest.

They tried to kidnap Carbela, only to be stopped by Scorpio Kardia, who seems to take interest in their challenge.

Wesda is the leader of the Jaguars, a priest who is a conduit between humans and the sun. He seeks to seize Scorpio Kardia's heart and use it as an offering to the sun. He is also interested in Carbela, whom he has chosen as his consort. Defeated by Scorpio Kardia.

Nahualpilli is one of the Jaguars, a grotesque man who enjoys skinning his victims and is sent to kill Scorpio Kardia. He reveals himself to Kardia wearing a Nahual. He is later moved by Athena's pleas to Scorpio Kardia for his life, and sacrifices himself to protect Athena from Wesda's murder attempt.

Chapter Aquarius

Fluorite is a young maid, servant to a house of aristocrats in the 18th century France. She seems to be in love with Aquarius Dégel, and sides with him in her quest for her missing father. She was created by Teshirogi on later stages of the anecdote's development as an audience surrogate.

Seraphina was the older sister of Unity who was close friend of him and Dégel when they were young. Some years later, she traveled the world looking for assistance for her country, but she became ill and died. Devastated by his sister's death, Unity decided to use her body as a vessel for Poseidon's soul so he could be free through her and make Bluegrad a prosperous place. Her body was successfully possessed by Poseidon and manifested his powers despite not seeming to have a conscience. In order to stop Poseidon, Dégel locked himself alongside Seraphina and the city of Atlantis inside his ice. Before Fluorite's creation, she was intended to have a larger role in the Anecdotes chapters she appears in, and Teshirogi considered including a fight scene between her and the Jewel Carnelian, in which she was to use the Blue Impulse attack from Kurumada's manga, but ultimately discarded the idea.

Jaeit is a spoiled, haughty young aristocrat, who treats his servants with great disdain, son to the marquis of a neighbouring country to France.

Garnet is a young woman of the high society of France in the 18th century, whose beauty is such, it is said it enables her to have command over both her enemies and friends. In the past the wife of a kind noble, she was forced to flee when tragedy fell upon her.

Named after the Indian diamond of legend, Koh-i-Noor Krjest is a 500-year-old man who came from the lands of the north, a survivor of Holy Wars against Hades, Poseidon and Ares, who took care of Sanctuary after the end of the holy war of the 15th century, mentor to Aquarius Dégel and the previous Aquarius Gold Saint. Given back his youth, he is one of Garnet's Jewels, who mastered the atom-freezing combat style of the Saints, as exhibited by his  and  techniques, and also wears an Orb armor, a dark version of the Aquarius Gold Cloth. Disillusioned by the neverending holy wars, Krjest met Garnet, who offered him the chance of achieving peace by means of everlasting life, thus he betrayed Athena and severed his ties with Sanctuary. He also appears briefly in Scorpio Kardia's extra short story Scorpion's Interlude. His name appears spelled as Крест (Russian for cross) in chapter 2. Krjest also appears as a teenager wearing the Aquarius Gold Cloth among the rest of Gold Saints of his generation, in the extra images supplied in vol. 3 of Anecdotes, and was later stated by Teshirogi to have been the youngest Saint in service in his time.

The Jewels are the elite troops of Garnet's household and personal guard to her, formed by the young warriors named after gemstones: , who has command over blood, caster of illusions,  who commands electricity,  of the flaming fist, and Koh-i-Noor Krjest.

Flailles is a young woman who seeks revenge on Garnet, who seduced her husband and then didn't reciprocate his affections, leading him to commit suicide.

From Kurumada's original manga, Ares, is the fierce and bloodthirsty god of war, who battled Athena and her Saints millennia ago, in the ages of myth. Since Kurumada has never revealed Ares' appearance in his manga, Teshirogi employed an original design to portray the deity in a brief cameo in Chapter Aquarius.

Chapter Cancer

Gioca is a young orphaned pickpocket in the streets of the 18th century Italy. Gioca first appears disguised as a boy, but her true gender and her background as the descendant of the guardian in the Rangda mask are revealed by the Black Saints. She inadvertently involves herself in the crisis of the Black Saints by stealing Cancer Manigoldo's coin purse during one of her scapades. Later, she stealthily follows the Saints by tracking their Cosmo, as she reveals she possesses a marginal mastery of Cosmo, having awakened her own sometime ago. She is accompanied by her little pet monkey . Gioca is sought after by the Black Saints in order to force her to destroy the Rangda mask. Driven to the edge of desperation by Yudo, she awakens her Cosmo once again, knocking out Yudo momentarily.

Pesce and Pigro are Gioca's young friends and fellow pickpockets.

Lumaca is the abusive self-appointed leader of Gioca's pickpocket band, whom he strips of their loot to send to the Nero criminal organization in order to improve his lowly status within it. Manigoldo kills him because of his crimes, and tries to interrogate his spirit; before Lumaca manages to reveal any relevant information, his spirit is cremated by means of Praesepe Demonic Blue Flames, conjured by Don Avido.

From Kurumada's original manga, the Black Saints, are former and failed Saints who instead of using their power to defend justice and peace, devoted it to the pursuit of their own ambitions, and turned to a life of crime and violence, thus they were stripped of their title of Saint of Athena. The Black Andromeda Saint and the Black Swan Saint are featured briefly during Koh-i-Noor Krjest's mention of previous wars in Chapter Aquarius.

He was driven out of the Sanctuary by Hakurei once he surrendered to greed. Avido still bears a grudge against his former master and believes the Sanctuary to be unworthy of ruling the world, as they are devoid of desires.

Alegre is a member of the Nero organization and enemy of Athena's Sanctuary, who secretly conspires to kill Cancer Manigoldo and Pisces Albafica, to steal their Gold Cloths. A priest corrupted by the delights of the flesh, he believes that people get closer to God when they follow their instinctive wishes. No longer hiding his true identity to Cancer Manigoldo and Pisces Albafica, he reveals himself as Black Whale Alegre, a Black Saint able to sense Manigoldo's mastery of the Praesepe arts. Manigoldo is still able to fight and kill the Black Saint with his physical attack Acubens. His Black Cloth is the counterpart for Mozes Whale Silver Cloth. His Black Cloth appeared briefly in a panel in Kurumada's manga.

Laimargos is a member of the Nero organization and enemy of Athena's Sanctuary, who expresses disdain towards Lumaca. He secretly conspires to kill Cancer Manigoldo and Pisces Albafica, to steal their Gold Cloths. Laimargos is also secretly a Black Saint. He was killed by the Roses of Albafica. Laimargos Black Cloth is a counterpart to Heracles Algethi's Silver Cloth.

Rusé is also a member of the Nero and enemy of Athena's Sanctuary. Rusé introduces himself as Black Crow Rusé, revealing his allegiance, and considering his beauty even greater than Pisces Albafica's, he engages him in combat, easily negating the Gold Saint's attack by means of his  technique, and also through his command over crows. He secretly conspires to kill Cancer Manigoldo and Albafica, to steal their Gold Cloths. Rusé is later killed by Avido as punishment for his failure to defeat Pisces Albafica. Rusé's Black Cloth is a counterpart to Crow Jamian's Silver Cloth.

Yudo is also a member of the Nero and enemy of Athena's Sanctuary, conspiring to kill Cancer Manigoldo and Albafica in order to steal their Gold Cloths. He mastered the Satori technique, which allows him to read minds. He reveals himself to Gioca as Black Hound Yudo, and claims to be the one who slaughtered her family, the guardians of Death Queen Island, years ago. This allowed the group to escape, but the other Black Saints remain trapped as long as the Rangda mask exists - as only a member of the guardian clan is able to destroy it, he tries to goad Gioca into doing it. He was killed by the Bloody Rose of Pisces Albafica. His Black Cloth is a counterpart to Hound Asterion's Silver Cloth.

Chapter Capricorn

Briefly appearing in the Lost Canvas main serialization, Puppis Lacaille is one of Capricorn El Cid's apprentices. His name and constellation were first revealed in the anime adaptation and his background is further explored in the Anecdotes chapters.

Lacaille's father is the renowned master swordsmith of their village located near the desert where a city known as  appeared one night, holding a martial tournament. He strives for his son Lacaille to hone his skills as a swordsmith to their peak.

A young Japanese woman known as the Beautiful Maiden of Catalania, Princess Mine has a deep connection to Capricorn El Cid's past, as she was his training partner during his time as a Saint apprentice, before succumbing to tuberculosis. Mysteriously returning from beyond the grave, she wields the legendary .

A participant in the tournament at the Catalania Colosseum, and a figure from El Cid's past, Ferser the Black Terror, once the supreme ruler of Catalania, prepares to engage Capricorn El Cid in battle, who is surprised to meet him again. In the past, friend and training partner to El Cid and Mine and a kind-hearted young man.

An enormous flail-wielding warrior, Demon Whirlwind Jericho battles against Capricorn El Cid in the tournament, meeting utter defeat at the hands of the Gold Saint.

A seemingly harmless human, Electric Mechanism Palmer, makes up for his weaknesses with the use of deadly electric mechanisms of his creation, such as a gigantic marionette, who engages Capricorn El Cid in the tournament of Catalania, not managing to defeat the Gold Saint.

First revealed by Teshirogi in the Lost Canvas main serialization, the Oneiroi are the gods of dreaming and children of Hypnos, malevolent deities who were being investigated by Capricorn El Cid and Sagittarius Sisyphos several years before their fateful encounter.

Also one of the Oneiroi, Phobetor is sibling to the god of Dreams and a child of Hypnos, the personification of nightmares who feeds on the dreams of humans, and the first of the Oneiroi to engage Capricorn El Cid in battle, taking possession of Ferser's body in order to achieve his goals.

Chapter Libra

Eleven years old, Yī-Lín is a cute girl who arrives to the famed Lushan waterfall, for a short stay with Libra Dohko.

Hào is Yī-Lín's father and Dohko's old friend.

An order of legendary warriors of the Xian Jing, the fairylands between human and spirit world, are the Taonia, or Pursuing Clerics, were renowned protectors of peace through the use of the power of the forces of nature, only to protect, and never to attack. The Taonia ambush Dohko, much to his amazement.

One of the Taonia, Liú-Xīng is the commander of the cadre of warriors that ambushes Libra Dohko. Liú-Xīng bears an uncanny resemblance to the late Pegasus Tenma, which amazes Dohko. His name means "Meteor"(as in Pegasus Meteor Fist).

A young man who leads the Taonia, Baí Zé aims to become emperor of China. True to his assumed name, he wears the 

Also one of the Taonia and loyal to the young Hakutaku. He engages Libra Dohko in battle, trying to burn him alive with his  technique, a powerful blaze shaped in the image of a fox.

A cheerful, care-free and unassuming young girl, Mǔdān is one of the Taonia, and younger sister of Hakutaku, to whom she is fiercely loyal. Mudan later encounters Libra Dohko and Liú-Xīng, engaging them in battle. She overwhelms the Gold Saint with her  technique, a massive concentration of powerful sound-waves, which Dohko is later able to overcome by destroying the chimes used by Mǔdān to manipulate the sound-waves.

Chapter Leo

A young girl who befriends Leo Regulus, during the time when he had recently been ordained as a Saint.

A young warrior woman, Conner's friend and protector, who has sworn to keep her from Geis harm. She battles the curses of the servants of the evil eye with her  technique.

The Irish deity and High King of the distant past, whom Conner's family served and worshipped.

An Irish aristocrat, the antagonist in Chapter Leo. In past, he was a friend of Conner's father .

An unearthly being summoned by Crúaich, to deal with Conner and Leo Regulus. She defeats Failinis and then engages Leo Regulus, trying to kill him along Conner with her   attack. Regulus is gravely wounded but is able to overcome the effects of her attack, and ultimately kills Shelley.

Crúaich's estranged young daughter.

Chapter Virgo

First introduced in a splash page in the first issues of The Lost Canvas, the Earthly Repose Star Specter appears in a more active role in the Anecdotes series, in the Virgo chapter, battling Virgo Asmita. He refers to himself to be a servant of Āṭavaka. He tries to murder Asmita by means of his  technique, but the Gold Saint proves too strong for the Specter and is soon overpowered and killed.

A young Buddhist man who met Virgo Asmita eleven years before the events described in the Virgo chapter, when both were training to achieve enlightenment.

The fierce Bennu Specter, one of the strongest in the army of Hades and with a prominent role in The Lost Canvas main serialization, also appears in the Anecdotes, years before the events of the Holy War of 1747.

 Kagaho's younger brother, who considered himself a burden for his sibling. Sui committed suicide many years ago to relieve his brother of the burden. His death had an enormous impact on Kagaho's behavior and way of thinking. As noted by Libra Dohko, Sui bore a striking resemblance to Alone. Sui appears briefly in Chapter Virgo, as a vision conjured by Asmita.

A singular Specter, who enjoys a special position among the 108 Demonic Stars of Hades' Army, and thus he is not subjected to Pandora's authority. The Earthly Repose Star's Specter was one of his subjects, as he rules in the hellish Six Realms of afterlife, that he considers his "gardens". He enslaves souls to do his bidding, such as in his technique , a distorted version of Asmita's The Treasures of Heavens technique, with which Āṭavaka tries to murder the Virgo Gold Saint during their final duel, but ultimately fails and dies.

Chapter Taurus 

Previously a Saint apprentice under Taurus Hasgard, Teneo became the inheritor of the Taurus Gold Cloth and the status of the Taurus Gold Saint after his mentor's demise in the Holy War of 1747. Six years later, Teneo fulfills his duty as guardian of the Taurus Palace at Sanctuary. Aries Shion dispatches Teneo to investigate suspicious activity in Mount Etna, related to the devastating , which took place millennia ago, in the ages of myth.

The lone survivor along Libra Dohko from the Holy War against Hades in 1747. He was appointed the Pope of Sanctuary by Athena six years before the events in Chapter Taurus.

Formerly Teneo's comrade of trials under Taurus Hasgard, Celintha forsook the ways of the Saints after her mentor's demise. In 1753, she has become a school teacher in the Rodrio village.

The youngest of Taurus Rasgado's pupils, whose life was tragically cut short after the Holy War of 1747. His grave is now visited often by Celintha.

An acquaintance of the late Pisces Albafica, who saved her life years ago. Agasha is a young woman who still leads a simple life in the Rodrio village, as assistant and friend to Celintha.

A towering, bull-like humanoid automaton, extremely powerful in the mysteries of the Cosmo. He is the person from whom Taurus Rasgado obtained the monicker of Aldebaran. Well regarded by Celintha and Rasgado despite his fearsome appearance, he is fondly named "Master Cor Tauri" by them. His name means "Bull Heart" in Latin.

The savage and most terrible monster in Greek Mythology, feared even by the Olympian gods. He was defeated and sealed by Zeus at the end of the Gigantomachia, in the ages of myth, beneath Mount Etna, in Sicily, along with his powerful brother, the giant . Signals of his dreaded resurrection prompt Aries Shion to investigate by sending Taurus Teneo to the area.

Chapter Sagittarius 

The Sagittarius Gold Saint in the main serialization of The Lost Canvas, younger brother of Leo Illias and uncle and mentor to Leo Regulus the embodiment of the ideal of the true Saint of Athena. In 1730, he appears as a young Saint apprentice, who has almost finished his training and is undergoing his final trials to attain the title of Saint and to prove he is worthy of the Sagittarius Gold Cloth.
 

The Taurus Gold Saint in the main serialization of The Lost Canvas, mentor to Taurus Teneo and gifted with tremendous strength and speed. In 1730, he appears as a young Saint apprentice. Nearing the end of his training, he seeks to prove he is worthy of the Taurus Gold Cloth and the title of Saint.

The older Gemini Gold Saint in the main serialization of The Lost Canvas, regarded as the man who can smash stars, and the conspirator who would attempt to overthrow the Pope of Sanctuary in the future. In 1730, Aspros appears as a young Saint apprentice, seeking to prove he is worthy of attaining the title of Saint and of the right to wear the Gemini Gold Cloth.

The shrine maidens and priestesses of Delphi.

Chapter Gemini

Previously mentioned only in Tatsuya Hamazaki's Hypermyth novelization, the Berserkers comprise the ranks of the army of Ares, the god of war, who engaged Athena in conflict millennia ago, being sealed by the goddess in the aftermath. They are brought back to life in 1747, by mysterious forces.

A Berserker previously defeated in the Coliseum by Athena's army eons ago, who came back to life after Gemini Aspros removed Athena's Seal from the Coliseum. Named after the Greek word for "blood" (αίμα). With his technique , Aίma is able to use Ares' flames around him to set his enemies ablaze and at the same time attack with his Jamadhar.

Also a Berserker from Ares' army, from the ranks of the Ephodos and brother to Jamadhar Hema. Named after the Greek word for "bones" (κόκκαλα). They engage Gemini Defteros and Aquarius Dégel in a fierce battle.

Briefly mentioned in the first chapter of Kurumada's manga and in Anecdotes Chapter Aquarius, the fierce and bloodthirsty god of war, who battled Athena and her Saints millennia ago, in the ages of myth.

Chapter Gemini Aspros

 A young girl, protected from her persecutors by Gemini Aspros. She seeks assistance from the Gold Saint in her desperate situation. She later awakens to her destiny as one of Hades' Specters, when she is enveloped by her Surplice.

 A Specter from Hades' ranks.

 A Specter from Hades' ranks, subordinate to Vampire Erhart.

 Chris's older sister, a young woman, vicious and merciless. Companion to Vampire Erhart and Upyr Leibold, she revels in wickedness and destruction.

Chapter Aries

 The Aries Gold Saint in the 18th century and future Pope of Sanctuary.

The Aries Gold Saint in the 16th century, veteran of the Holy War against Hades in that era, and comrade-in-arms and close friend to Altar Hakurei and Cancer Sage.

Previously a Saint apprentice under Taurus Hasgard, Teneo became the inheritor of the Taurus Gold Cloth and the status of the Taurus Gold Saint after his mentor's demise in the Holy War of 1747. Six years later, Teneo fulfills his duty as guardian of the Taurus Palace at Sanctuary.

The Centaurus Silver Saint in the 16th Century.

Taurus Teneo's disciple.

The Elder Twins Chapter

The Altar Silver Saint in the 16th century. Twin brother of Cancer Sage.

The Arrow Silver Saint in the 16th century.

The Cancer Gold Saint in the 16th century, twin brother of Altar Hakurei and future Pope of Sanctuary in The Lost Canvas main serialization.

The Leo Gold Saint in the previous 18th century generation, father to Leo Regulus. Highly regarded in Sanctuary and considered a hero and example of the true Saint. Comrade in arms to Scorpio Zaphiri and Pisces Rugonis.

The strong-willed and determined Scorpio Gold Saint in the previous 18th century generation. He intended to bestow Poseidon's divine power upon himself at the expense of his life and his dignity as a Saint.

The Pisces Gold Saint in the previous 18th century generation. Comrade in arms to Leo Ilias and Scorpio Zaphiri.

The Aries Gold Saint in the previous 16th century generation. Comrade in arms to Cancer Sage and Aquarius Krjest. He appears to show allegiance to Hades.

The Taurus Gold Saint in the previous 16th century generation. Comrade in arms to Cancer Sage and Aquarius Krest.

The Aquarius Gold Saint in the 14th century, and veteran of several Holy Wars. Comrade in arms to Leo Ilias, Cancer Sage, Scorpio Zaphiri and Pisces Rugonis, and mentor to Aquarius Dégel. He appears in the days of his youth, as a wise and prudent Gold Saint who is aware of the crisis faced by Athena's Sanctuary.

See also
List of Saint Seiya: The Lost Canvas – Anecdotes chapters
List of Saint Seiya: The Lost Canvas characters
List of Saint Seiya characters

References 

Lost Canvas Anecdotes